The Chery Tiggo 7 is a compact crossover SUV produced by Chery under the Tiggo product series. The first generation was launched in 2016, and a rebadged variant sold by Qoros was planned in 2017 which later became a facelift for the 2018 model year Tiggo 7 dubbed the Tiggo 7 Fly. The first generation Tiggo 7 also underpins the Exeed LX. The second generation model was launched in 2020 and was previewed by a design concept unveiled in 2019.


First generation (2016)

The first generation Chery Tiggo 7 was originally previewed by the Chery TX SUV Concept during the 2012 Beijing Auto Show, the production version was revealed during the 2016 Beijing Auto Show in China. 

Engine options available initially includes a 1.5-litre inline-four turbo petrol engine and a 2.0-litre inline-four petrol engine.

The production Chery Tiggo 7 was later launched on the China car market in July, positioned above the Chery Tiggo 5 compact crossover.

2018 facelift and Qoros Young rebadge

In August 2017, the Qoros Young compact crossover was revealed as a rebadged version of the Chery Tiggo 7. Chery owns half of the Qoros holding while the other half belongs to Singapore-based investment company Kenon Holdings. The Qoros Young never launched on the market, with its design instead reused as the facelifted Chery Tiggo 7 Fly revealed in 2018.

The Tiggo 7 Fly debuted in September 2018. The transmission is a 6-speed dual-clutch transmission or a 6-speed manual gearbox.

Second generation (2020) 

The second generation Chery Tiggo 7 debuted as a concept during the 2019 Guangzhou Auto Show. Engine options of the second generation Chery Tiggo 7 initially includes a 1.5-litre inline-four turbo petrol engine producing 147 hp, 1.5-litre inline-four turbo petrol engine producing 156 hp and a 1.6-litre inline-four petrol engine producing 197 hp.

Tiggo 7 Plus
The Tiggo 7 Plus is a more premium variant of the regular Tiggo 7, aiming at a slightly higher market segment. Marketed as the Tiggo 7 Pro overseas, the Tiggo 7 Plus features a restyled front bumper and grilles and slightly improved interior. The infotainment system of the Tiggo 7 Plus comes with Baidu CarLife and Apple CarPlay and runs on Chery’s Lion 4.0 operating system. 

The 1.5-litre turbo engine consumes  while the 1.5-litre turbo engine with 48-volt mild hybrid system consumes . The 1.6-litre turbo engine variant consumes . 

The Tiggo 7 Plus underwent a facelift in October 2022, initially in China, for the 2023 model year.

References

External links

Official website
iran web site

Tiggo 7
Compact sport utility vehicles
Crossover sport utility vehicles
Cars introduced in 2016
Cars of China
Cars of Brazil